Pál B. Nagy (born 2 May 1935) is a Hungarian fencer. He won a gold medal in the team épée event at the 1968 Summer Olympics.

References

External links
 

1935 births
Living people
Hungarian male épée fencers
Olympic fencers of Hungary
Fencers at the 1968 Summer Olympics
Olympic gold medalists for Hungary
Olympic medalists in fencing
People from Szolnok
Medalists at the 1968 Summer Olympics
Universiade medalists in fencing
Universiade bronze medalists for Hungary
Medalists at the 2009 Summer Universiade
Sportspeople from Jász-Nagykun-Szolnok County
20th-century Hungarian people
21st-century Hungarian people